Panyu, alternately romanized as Punyu, is one of 11 urban districts of the prefecture-level city of Guangzhou, the capital of Guangdong Province, China. It was a separate county-level city before its incorporation into modern Guangzhou in 2000.

Geography
Panyu lies at the heart of the Pearl River Delta, its boundary straddles from latitudes 22.26' to 23.05', and sprawls from longitudes 113.14' to 113.42'. Facing the Lion Sea in the east and the estuary of the Pearl River in the south, its eastern border is separated from Dongguan by a strip of water, and the western border of Panyu is adjacent to the cities of Nanhai, Shunde and Zhongshan, while it abuts the downtown of Guangzhou in the north. Shiqiao may have once been called "Stone Bridge town", but because of war, the characters changed, so Shiqiao was rewritten using the characters for "city" and "bridge".

History

The Chinese settlement at Panyu was established by the Qin armies under Zhao Tuo during their first failed invasion of the Baiyue in Guangdong in 214 BC. There are at least 11 separate theories on the etymology of the name. Upon the fall of the Qin, Zhao Tuo established Panyu as the capital of his kingdom of Nanyue in 204 BC. Archaeological evidence shows that it was a burgeoning commercial center: among the present material object remnants, there are those of Southeast Asian, Indian, and even African origin.

Yuexiu District, most of Baiyun and Huangpu Districts, and parts of parts of Liwan, Haizhu, and Tianhe Districts were originally part of Panyu County but were ceded to Guangzhou as it expanded. On 20 May 1992, Panyu County was upgraded into a county-level city and, on 21 May 2000, Panyu was fully converted into a district of Guangzhou. By 28 April 2005, the southern part of Panyu was split off as the new Nansha District. On 30 September 2012, three southern towns of Panyu—Dongchong, Dagang, and Lanhe—were removed to Nansha's jurisdiction.

Administrative divisions

Panyu district administers ten subdistricts and six towns.  The district executive, legislature and judiciary are based in the Shiqiao, together with the CPC and PSB branches. On 1 December 2012 three towns (Dongchong, Dagang, & Lanhe) were transferred to Nansha District.

Transfer Towns
The following towns have been abolished, some by absorption into the Development zone of the Nansha District.
 Lianhuashan
 Xinken
 Tanzhouu
 Yuwotou
 Huangge
 Hengli
 Wanqingsha
 Dongchong
 Dagang
 Lanhe

Villages
Under its various Subdistricts and Towns (and in the one Development zone), Panyu has 305 administration villages (行政村) - i.e. 305 village governments.

There are other 'natural villages' (自然村) which administratively count as being in one or another of the administration villages.

Economy
Statistics shows that in the year of 1998, the GDP in the district was 33.25 billion yuan, an increase of 13% over the previous year, and the GDP per capita was 35.5 thousand Yuan, an increase of 11%, compared with the previous year.

The amusement park operator Chimelong has its headquarters on the grounds of Chimelong Paradise in the district.

Transportation
Guangzhou Metro Lines 2 and 3 serve parts of Panyu District. Line 2 was extended into the district in Sept. 2010.
Guangzhou South Station, the main high-speed railway station serving Guangzhou, is situated within the boundaries of Panyu District.

Panyu Public Transport operates buses in the district.

Metro
Panyu is currently service by four metro lines operated by Guangzhou Metro:

 - Luoxi, Nanpu, Huijiang, Shibi, Guangzhou South Station
 - Xiajiao, Dashi, Hanxi Changlong, Shiqiao, Panyu Square
 - Higher Education Mega Center North, Higher Education Mega Center South, Xinzao, Guanqiao , Shiqi, Haibang, Dichong, Qingsheng
 - Guangzhou South Station, Shibi, Xiecun, Zhongcun, Hanxi Changlong, Nancun Wanbo, Yuangang, Banqiao, Higher Education Mega Center South()

Tourist attractions
Yuyin Mount Garden：One of the four famous gardens in Guangdong Province in the Qing Dynasty.
Baomo Garden
Lotus Hill
Changlong Night Zoo
Xiangjiang Wildlife World
Chime-Long Paradise

Major educational institutions
The Guangzhou Higher Education Mega Center includes more than ten higher education institutions.

Schools for Chinese students:
 Guangdong Zhongyuan High School

International schools:
 Canadian International School of Guangzhou
 Guangzhou Korea School
 Clifford International School

Notable individuals
People born in or with family links to the Panyu District:

International Relations

Panyu has a cooperational agreement with:

 Aveiro, Portugal
 Prague 5, Czech Republic

Climate

See also
 Hung Shing

Notes

References

External links

Panyu Panyu District official website
Photos of Panyu, courtesy of Vince K. Chan
Panyu Travel Guide
'Red Diamond', on Panyu's diamond processing industry, by Venkatesan Vembu, Daily News & Analysis, 11 March 2007

 
Districts of Guangzhou